Bettviller is a commune in the Moselle department of the Grand Est administrative region in north-eastern France.

The village belongs to the Pays de Bitche. It is mentioned for the first time in 1157, in the forms "Bedebur" and "Bedeviller" in 1496 (oratory). The present village was built in the 16th century.

Population

See also
 Communes of the Moselle department

References

External links

 Bettviller

Communes of Moselle (department)